Carlos Alfredo Grosso (born 1943) is an Argentinian politician who was intendente (mayor) of Buenos Aires from 1989 to 1992. A member of the Justicialist Party, he was appointed by President Carlos Menem as a successor for Facundo Suárez Lastra.

References

Politicians from Buenos Aires
People from Chaco Province
Mayors of Buenos Aires
Justicialist Party politicians
Living people
1943 births